Diadelia x-fasciata is a species of beetle in the family Cerambycidae. It was described by Gahan in 1890. It is known from Madagascar.

References

Diadelia
Beetles described in 1890